King's House School is a private day preparatory school in Richmond, London. Founded in 1946, it has 450 pupils aged between 3 and 13.

Present school 

The school is currently split into three parts: 
King's House Nursery School (ages 3–4)
King's House Junior School (ages 4–8)
King's House Senior School (ages 9–13)

Facilities 
35-acre sports ground and club house
State-of-art theatre
Music and Mac suite
Gymnasium
Astroturf
Science laboratories
Theatre
Two ICT suites

Sport 
The school specialises in the three sports of rugby, cricket and football. Football operates at the beginning of the year until the winter term, when rugby comes in play. Cricket follows in the summer term. Sports lessons take place at King's House Sports Ground in nearby Chiswick.

The school also supports athletics, basketball, cross-country, fitness training, gymnastics, judo and swimming.

Choir
In the late 1970s, the school's choir was involved in West End performances, supplying a chorus for the Andrew Lloyd Webber stage musical, Evita. In 1989, a new generation of singers provided vocals on Mike + The Mechanics' chart-topping single "The Living Years".

Major achievements 
 Exterior featured in the 1995 children's television series Julia Jekyll and Harriet Hyde
 2006 National IAPS General Knowledge Award
 2015 u14 National Rugby champions

Historical case of child abuse 
Former teacher Michael Porteous was sentenced to two-and-a-half years in prison for sexually abusing a pupil at the school in the 1970s. The school issued a statement, saying: "We are shocked that a former teacher of the school abused his position of trust in this way and committed a deplorable crime against a pupil in his care."

Alumni
Lawrence Dallaglio, former England rugby captain
Zac Goldsmith, former Conservative MP for Richmond Park
Nigel Planer, actor, comedian, novelist and playwright
Colin Charvis, former Welsh rugby captain
Jesse Wood, son of Ronnie Wood

References

External links

1946 establishments in England
Private boys' schools in London
Private schools in the London Borough of Richmond upon Thames
Preparatory schools in London
Richmond, London